YKM may refer to:
Yau Kung Moon, a southern Chinese style of martial arts
Yakima Air Terminal, code from YKM, a public airport located in Yakima County